Doe Bank is the point where the A453 Tamworth Road meets the A5127  north of Sutton Coldfield in the West Midlands, England.

Areas of Birmingham, West Midlands